Lâm Hà is a district (huyện) of Lâm Đồng province in the Central Highlands region of Vietnam.

Lâm Hà is the destination of Hanoians going to reclaim virgin soil, showing in its name: Lâm is from Lâm Đồng and Hà is the short form of Hanoi.

Lâm Hà is the home of a famous product: King- offering banana named Laba. The tourism attraction here is Elephant waterfall.

As of 2003 the district had a population of 135,809. The district covers an area of 979 km². The district capital lies at Đình Văn.

References

Districts of Lâm Đồng province